The Cinderella waxbill (Glaucestrilda thomensis) is a near-threatened species of estrildid finch found in drier regions of south-western Angola around Namibe Province, north and east to south-west Huila Province and north to Fazenda do Cuito in Huambo and extreme north-western Namibia. It has an estimated global distribution of 95,700 km2.

Habitat
The Cinderella waxbill is found in subtropical and tropical (lowland) dry shrubland, savannah and forest habitats at altitude of 200 to 500 m. It is observed that the recent development of a hydroelectric plant on the Cunene River at Epupa Falls has caused changes to insect biodiversity which were relied on by the Cinderella waxbill during feeding of its young.  Thus threatening its food source to be depleted.

The waxbill also eats grass seeds, nectar and insects. The Cinderella is diurnal.

References

External links
 BirdLife International species factsheet
Species text in The Atlas of Southern African Birds

Cinderella waxbill
Birds of Central Africa
Cinderella waxbill
Taxobox binomials not recognized by IUCN